Artemis is a 2017 science fiction novel written by Andy Weir. It takes place in the late 2080s in Artemis, the first and so far only city on the Moon. It follows the life of porter and smuggler Jasmine "Jazz" Bashara as she gets caught up in a conspiracy for control of the city. 

The audiobook edition (published by Amazon.com) is narrated by Rosario Dawson.

Plot
In Artemis, the first city on the Moon, porter and part-time smuggler Jasmine "Jazz" Bashara is offered an opportunity by a regular client, wealthy businessman Trond Landvik, to assist him with a new business venture. While meeting with Trond, Jazz briefly encounters an associate of his named Jin Chu who attempts to conceal a case marked with the name ZAFO. Trond intends to take over Sanchez Aluminum, which currently enjoys a lucrative permanent contract with the city for free energy in exchange for providing the city's entire oxygen supply as a by-product from aluminum production. Trond asks Jazz to sabotage the company's anorthite harvesters so he can step in with his own, and when he offers her a life-changing sum of money to carry out the criminal activity, Jazz accepts.

Jazz borrows some welding equipment from her estranged father Ammar, and a small robot called a HIB from a business associate of his. She visits the Apollo 11 landing site disguised as a tourist, leaving the HIB in place outside the airlock so that it can open the hatch for her without the assistance of a human EVA master. The next day, while an electronic device created by her scientist friend Martin Svoboda makes it seem as though she is in her living quarters, Jazz treks across the moon's surface to where the harvesters are collecting ore. She successfully sabotages one, but is spotted by the camera of another. Jazz destroys two more, but flees to avoid capture by an approaching EVA team before she is able to disable the last harvester. With EVA masters guarding every airlock, Jazz is discovered by her former friend Dale, whom she despises for stealing her boyfriend. Dale offers not to report her if she would put aside her resentment and try to rekindle their friendship, which she reluctantly agrees to do. Finding Trond and his bodyguard murdered, Jazz looks for Jin Chu at an expensive hotel. She is attacked by Trond's assassin, but manages to escape with Jin's ZAFO case, which she gives to Svoboda to study. Jazz learns that Sanchez Aluminum is a front for O Palácio, Brazil's largest and most powerful organized crime syndicate, and that the killer, named Alvares, is now after her. Jin agrees to meet Jazz, but  betrays her to Alvares to save himself. Jazz, anticipating Jin's deception, executes the trap she set, incapacitating Alvares and then turning him over to the city's de facto police chief, Rudy.

Svoboda discovers that ZAFO is a virtually lossless cable ("Zero Attenuation Fiber Optic"), which will allow long-distance transmission of data without the need for repeaters, revolutionizing communications infrastructure. As the manufacturing process requires low gravity, Artemis is an ideal location, and the new industry would significantly boost the city's stagnant economy. Jazz confronts the city's administrator Ngugi, who reveals she has been using Jazz as bait to flush out O Palácio's operatives, not wanting to allow Artemis to be seized by a crime syndicate. Jazz then enlists her reluctant friends and father to stop O Palácio by destroying Sanchez's smelter, which will allow Trond's daughter Lene, who inherited his fortune, to seize the pertinent contracts and rebuild. Dale helps Jazz break into the plant, where she sabotages the smelter to overheat and destroy itself, but in doing so unwittingly creates deadly chloroform that is pumped into the city's air supply. With under an hour before the unconscious residents of Artemis die from their exposure, Jazz races to access Trond's stockpile of untainted oxygen. She sacrifices herself to save the city, but Dale is able to save her. Lene pays Jazz for her services, and she finds herself temporarily wealthy. After buying her father a new welding workshop to replace the one she accidentally destroyed as a teenager, Jazz is called to Ngugi's office, where the administrator informs her of her impending deportation. Jazz convinces Ngugi of her value to the city as an "authorized" harmless smuggler whose monopoly of the illegal trade would keep out other, more dangerous criminals. Ngugi relents, but forces her to pay most of her remaining money to the city as a fine. Jazz and Dale rekindle their friendship. Jazz tasks Kelvin, her smuggling partner on Earth, to discover which company Jin Chu works for and invest in it before ZAFO and its earning potential is announced.

Characters 

 Jasmine "Jazz" Bashara, a citizen of Artemis who works as delivery woman and also smuggles goods to survive in the expensive city
 Ammar Bashara, Jazz's father, who does not approve of her rebellion; he is a Muslim who works as a welder in Artemis
 Trond Landvik, a wealthy businessman from Norway, who lives with his 16-year-old daughter, Lene
 Lene Landvik, Trond's daughter, who was unable to walk on Earth after an accident, but can move on crutches in low lunar gravity
 Martin Svoboda, a Ukrainian scientist who works at the European Space Agency office in Artemis
 Rudy DuBois, the Canadian head of Artemis's security
 Dale Shapiro, a professor from the EVA guild, with whom Jazz has a grudge
 Bob Lewis, a former US Marine, now EVA guild coach
 Fidelis Ngugi, the city's founder and administrator
 Marcelo Álvarez, a Brazilian murderer, who works for O Palacio
 Jin Chu, a partner of Landvik from Hong Kong
 Loretta Sanchez, owner of Sanchez Aluminum
 Kelvin Otieno, Jazz's pen pal from Kenya and smuggling partner

Publication
Artemis was released on November 14, 2017, and debuted at No. 6 on the New York Times Best Seller list in December 2017. The book remained on the list for nine weeks, and peaked at No. 4.

Artemis debuted on the Los Angeles Times Bestseller List for Hardcover Fiction at No. 4 in December 2017, and peaked at No. 1 the following week. The novel stayed at that level for two weeks, and remained on the list for a total of nine weeks. Artemis also debuted on the Locus Magazine Bestsellers List for Hardcovers at No. 2 in February 2018, peaking at number 1 for one month in March and staying on the list for a total of four months.

Film adaptation
In May 2017, 20th Century Fox (now 20th Century Studios) and New Regency acquired the film rights to the not-yet-published novel, with Simon Kinberg and Aditya Sood attached to produce. Phil Lord and Christopher Miller were announced as co-directors in September 2017. In July 2018, it was announced that Geneva Robertson-Dworet would write the screenplay.

Reviews
Writing for The New York Times, science-fiction author N. K. Jemisin gave a mixed review, writing that the book "is a heist narrative at heart—but it lacks the core elements of modern heist narratives: no team of charming specialists, no surprise plot twists. That may be fine for 'hard' science fiction fans who prioritize idea over execution, or who simply crave well-researched technical speculation presented as fiction." In contrast, a reviewer for Salon called it "A sci-fi crowd pleaser made for the big screen."

Awards 
Approximately 35,000 Goodreads readers chose Artemis as the best Science Fiction novel of 2017. Artemis won the 2018 Dragon Award for Best Science Fiction Novel and the 2019 Geffen Award for Best Translated Science Fiction Book. The novel was also a finalist for the 2018 Prometheus Award.

See also
 Moon in fiction
 Colonization of the Moon
 Artemis, Greek goddess of the Moon
 Artemis program

References

2017 science fiction novels
2017 American novels
American science fiction novels
Novels set on the Moon
Fiction set in the 2080s
Novels set in the future
Works by Andy Weir
Crown Publishing Group books